Farrer Park is a subzone of the Rochor planning area in the Central Region of Singapore, bounded by Serangoon Road, Rangoon Road, Race Course Road, Northumberland Road, Tekka Lane and Bukit Timah Road.

This article is about the Farrer Park subzone, part of the Rochor planning area as defined by the Urban Redevelopment Authority (URA). Historically, the name "Farrer Park" referred to an open field situated to the west of this subzone. This open field is now commonly known as "Farrer Park Field" and is located within Kallang planning area.

Etymology
Farrer Park and Farrer Road were named after R. J. Farrer (died 1956), who was Municipal Assessor and later President of the Municipal Commissioners in the 1920s. In 1952, there was an abortive attempt to change the name of Farrer Road in order to avoid confusion with Farrer Park, situated in a different location.

See also
Little India, Singapore
Rochor
Piccadilly Grand

References

National Heritage Board (2002), Singapore's 100 Historic Places, Archipelago Press, 
Victor R Savage, Brenda S A Yeoh (2004), Toponymics - A Study of Singapore Street Names, Eastern University Press,

External links
 Infopedia

Places in Singapore
Rochor